Azamora bilinealis is a species of snout moth in the genus Azamora. It was described by Hans Georg Amsel in 1956, and is known from Venezuela.

References

Chrysauginae
Moths described in 1956
Moths of South America